Sobareutis conchophanes is a species of moth of the family Yponomeutidae. It is found in Borneo.

The male of this species has a wingspan of 12 mm. The hindwings are fuscous.

References

Yponomeutidae
Moths of Borneo